Catullus 4 is a poem by the ancient Roman writer Catullus. The poem concerns the retirement of a well-traveled ship (referred to as a "phaselus", also sometimes cited as "phasellus", a variant spelling). Catullus draws a strong analogy with human aging, rendering the boat as a person that flies and speaks, with palms (the oars) and purpose.

The poem is complex, with numerous geographic references and elaborate litotic double negatives in a list-like manner. It borrows heavily from Ancient Greek vocabulary, and also uses Greek grammar in several sections.  The meter of the poem is unusual — iambic trimeter, which was perhaps chosen to convey a sense of speed over the waves.

Scholars remain uncertain whether the story of the construction and voyages of this phasellus (ship, yacht, or pinnace), as described or implied in the poem, can be taken literally. Professor A. D. Hope in his posthumous book of translations from Catullus  is one translator who takes it so. His introduction calls the phasellus “his yacht, in which he [Catullus]  must have made the return voyage [from Bithynia]” and the translation ends 
Until she made landfall in this limpid lake. /
But that was aforetime and she is laid up now . . . 
However Hope also left, in his final collection of poetry Aubade, a much freer translation, adaptation, or erotic parody, in which the phasellus seems to be, in effect, a phallus. This version says that the phasellus
claims that in his hey-day with mainsail and spanker / He outsailed all vessels; 
and the ending becomes:
At his last landfall now, beyond all resurgence, / 
View him careened upon a final lee-shore; / 
. . . Sing for the captain who will put to sea no more!

Among a number of other interpretations, Catullus 4 has also been interpreted as a parody of epic poetry, or the boat as a metaphor for the Ship of state.

Text

Notes

Bibliography

References

External links
Catullus 4: Text, translations and notes, at the Perseus Collection.
Catullus 4 in English and several other languages.

C004
Works about ships
Articles containing video clips